The marzipan pig is a traditional German, Dutch, Belgian, and Scandinavian confectionery consisting of marzipan shaped as a pig. 

During Jul in Norway and Sweden, a tradition is to eat a rice porridge known as risgrøt (risgrynsgröt in Swedish); a single almond is hidden in the porridge. Whoever finds the almond receives a marzipan pig as a prize. The same tradition exists for Christmas Eve in Denmark, but with risalamande.

In Germany, marzipan pigs are given at New Year's for good luck (Glücksschwein).

In popular culture
The Marzipan Pig (1986) is a children's book by Russell Hoban. The story was filmed as one of the HBO Storybook Musicals. It was also on the list of programs broadcast by ABC Television.

Posankka is a hybrid marzipan pig–rubber ducky statue in Turku, Finland near the University of Turku.

References

German confectionery
German traditions
Marzipan
Christmas food